The 1931 Australia rugby union tour of New Zealand was a series of rugby union games undertaken by the Australia team in New Zealand against invitational and national teams of New Zealand.

The Queensland Rugby Union had collapsed in 1919 and would not be reborn until 1929 leaving the New South Wales Rugby Union to administer the game in Australia at the national representative level. In 1931 finally an "all-australian" team was refounded.

Preliminary match 
Scores and results list Australia's points tally first.

Tour match 
Scores and results list Australia's points tally first.

Sources

 The Brisbane Courier Tuesday 4 August 1931 p 6
 Morning Bulletin Monday 24 August 1931 p 10
 The Canberra Times Thursday 27 August 1931 p 1
 Townsville Daily Bulletin Monday 31 August 1931 p 9 
 The Sydney Morning Herald Thursday 3 September 1931 p 14
 The Sydney Morning Herald Monday 7 September 1931 p 13
 The Sydney Morning Herald Thursday 10 September 1931 p 12
 Morning Bulletin Monday 14 September 1931 p 10
 The Sydney Morning Herald Thursday 17 September 1931 p 12

Australia national rugby union team tours of New Zealand
Australia Rugby Union
New Zealand Rugby Union